The Nairobi Hospital is a private hospital located in upperhill area, Nairobi, Kenya.The hospital was founded in 1954 as a European hospital.

Location
It is located along Argwings Kodhek Road, Upper Hill, Nairobi. The coordinates of the hospital are 01°17'46.0"S, 36°48'17.0"E (Latitude:-1.296115; Longitude:36.804718).

Overview
The institution was officially opened on 9 April 1954, as an exclusively European Hospital, in Kenya, which was then a colony of the United Kingdom. On 19 October 1961, it began serving non-Europeans and the name was changed to The Nairobi Hospital.

Expansion
In August 2016, The hospital implemented expansion of its physical infrastructure, staffing levels, and bed capacity. The planned expansion includes the following:

 Increase bed capacity from 355 to 750 
Erecting of a 14-storey building, to house inpatient and outpatient departments, a diagnostic centre, operating rooms, an intensive care unit, a specialist kidney department, and a specialised kidney and bladder surgery unit.
 Construction of a office block with specialised medical services
 Erection of doctors' plaza

See also
List of hospitals in Kenya
 Borna Nyaoke-Anoke, physician and medical researcher

References

External links

Hospitals established in 1954
Hospitals in Nairobi
1954 establishments in Kenya